The 54-turbine Black Law Wind Farm has a total capacity of 188 megawatts (MW). The first phase of 42 turbines was the largest  sufficient to meet the average electricity needs of 70,000 homes each year - or a town the size of Paisley - and is estimated to save around 200,000 tonnes of carbon dioxide emissions a year.

The £90 million wind farm is located near Climpy in South Lanarkshire and has been built on an old opencast coalmine site which was completely restored to shallow wetlands during the construction programme. It employs seven permanent staff on site and created 200 jobs during construction. Phase 1 was the first built in 2005, consisting of 42 turbines, which at the time was the largest onshore wind farm in the UK. Phase 2 added another 12 turbines in 2006, with subsequent extensions in 2017 bringing the total turbine count to 88.

The project has received wide recognition for its contribution to environmental objectives, including praise from the Royal Society for the Protection of Birds, who said that the scheme was not only improving the landscape in a derelict opencast mining site, but also benefiting a range of wildlife in the area, with an extensive habitat management projects covering over 14 square kilometres.

See also

Wind power in Scotland
List of onshore wind farms

References

External links

Wind farms in Scotland